LINE is a close-quarters combat system, derived from various martial arts, utilized by the United States Marine Corps between 1989 and 1998, and then from 1998 to 2007 by US Army Special Forces. It was developed by Ron Donvito, USMC (Retired).

Officially, the name stands for "Linear Involuntary Neural-override Engagement"; this is, however, a backronym coined during the project's inception.

Design 

The system was designed to be executed within specific and stringent combat-oriented conditions: 

 (a.) all techniques must not be vision dominant; techniques may be executed effectively in low-light conditions, or other impaired visibility conditions (i.e., smoke or gas)
 (b.) extreme mental and physical fatigue
 (c.) usable by the Marine / soldier while wearing full combat gear
 (d.) proper execution of the techniques must cause death to the opponent
 (e.) gender neutrality; must be usable by—and against—either gender

These parameters were viewed as the most likely conditions that a combat Marine or Soldier would face in close-range combat, since most close combat engagements were likely to occur at night or under reduced visibility, while the Marine or Soldier was fatigued and wearing their combat load, and when facing asymmetrical odds, such as a numerically superior force. These requirements meant that many flamboyant techniques, exotic kicks, or movements requiring extraordinary feats of strength or agility were excluded from consideration under the LINE system. Techniques like classic judo "hip throws", for instance, were excluded because of the possibility of entanglement on a practitioner's war-belt.

The system's techniques were designed to be easily learned and retained through repetition. The requirement and demands that the system be drilled, repeated, and constantly revisited led to some criticism since the primary usersmilitary, including special operations, personneloften had enormous demands upon their time, and as a consequence often lacked the ability to maintain high degrees of proficiency in the techniques.

History

USMC
LINE was adopted by the Marine Corps in 1989 at a Course Content Review Board (CRB) at Quantico, Virginia. All techniques were demonstrated for and deemed medically feasible by the Armed Forces Medical Examiner (given a single attack opponent) and a board of forensic pathologists from the Armed Forces Institute of Pathology (AFIP) in 1991. LINE was replaced by the Marine Corps Martial Arts Program (MCMAP) by Marine Corps Order 1500.54, published in 2002, although it had been actually dropped in 1998, as a "revolutionary step in the development of martial arts skills for Marines and replaces all  other close-combat related systems preceding its introduction."

US Army Special Forces

The LINE System was adopted in 1998 by U.S. Army Special Forces at the Special Forces Qualification Course (SFQC). Primary instruction took place during phase II and was remediated in phases III and V at Fort Bragg, North Carolina. LINE was replaced by the Modern Army Combatives Program (MACP) in October 2007.

US Air Forces

In 2007 the Chief of Staff of the Air Force read an article in the Air Force Times about Airmen training in the LINE system and ordered a review of all hand-to-hand combat in the Air Force  which resulted in the Air Force adopting a program based upon the Modern Army Combatives Program (MACP).

Units trained
During its existence, units trained included (but were not limited to):

 1st SWTG, United States Army
 United States Army Special Forces
 1st SFG, United States Army
 3rd SFG, United States Army
 5th SFG, United States Army
 7th SFG, United States Army
 10th SFG, United States Army
 19th SFG, United States Army National Guard
 20th SFG, United States Army National Guard
 SEAL Team II, United States Navy
 82nd Airborne Division, United States Army
 101st Airborne Division, United States Army
 3rd Infantry Division, United States Army
 4th Infantry Division, United States Army
 172nd Infantry Brigade Stryker, United States Army
 SOC South, United States Army
 1st COSCOM, United States Army
 96th Civil Affairs, United States Army
 32nd MedCom, United States Army
 44th MedCom, United States Army
 112th Signal Bn, United States Army
 27th Engineer Bn, United States Army
 8th PsyOps, United States Army
 CGSC, United States Army
 5th ASOS, United States Air Force
 5th CBCG, United States Air Force

See also 
Combatives
List of martial arts
Marine Corps Martial Arts Program
S.C.A.R.S. (military)
SPEAR System
Taijutsu
United States Army Combatives School

References 

Combat
North American martial arts
United States Marine Corps in the 20th century